Elgin is a city in Bastrop County in the U.S. state of Texas. The population was 9,784 at the 2020 census. Elgin is also known as the Sausage Capital of Texas and the Brick Capital of the Southwest, due to the presence of three operating brickyards in the mid-20th century (two of which are still open).

History 

In 1871, the Houston and Texas Central Railroad (succeeded by the Southern Pacific Transportation Company) built through the area and established a flag stop called Glasscock named for George W. Glasscock, a local resident and Republic of Texas soldier who lived in the area in the 1830s. Glasscock was renamed on August 18, 1872, for Robert Morris Elgin, the railroad's land commissioner, following the practice of naming new railroad towns after officers of the company. Elgin was established. The original plat placed the train depot in the center of a one-square-mile area.

These plans, however, were thwarted due to a major flood of the Colorado River in 1869, hence the rerouting of the railroad through what is now Elgin.

Elgin was incorporated, received a post office in 1873, and a Baptist Sunday school began meeting in a private home. Much of the town's early population was drawn from nearby Perryville, which the railroad had bypassed. The town was known by three different names: the name Young's Settlement was chosen, probably in honor of the Michael Young family; Perryville, possibly for Perry Young, who was Michael Young's son; and Hogeye. The post office was officially named Young's Settlement, and the churches and Masonic Lodge carried the name Perryville. The name Hogeye was given to the stage stop at the Litton home where dances were held and, according to legend, the fiddler knew only one tune: "Hogeye", which he played over and over as the crowd danced on the puncheon floor.

In 1879, Elgin was described as a "thriving depot town" of 400. It had a newspaper, a gin, and a gristmill. Three years later Methodists erected the first church building in town. In 1884, Elgin had five general stores, two druggists, three cotton gins, and a saloon; that year, Thomas O'Conner started a brick-making enterprise that eventually led Elgin to adopt the epithet "Brick Capital of the Southwest." In 1885, a group of citizens met in Elgin to organize a new north-south railroad which would run from Taylor, the rail head for the Missouri, Kansas and Texas ("Katy") Railroad  to the north, through Elgin to Bastrop, the county seat,  to the south. The Taylor, Elgin, and Bastrop Railroad was formed in 1886 and began building the line. That same year, the "Katy" acquired the line and continued the construction on to Houston. Thus, Elgin became the beneficiary of two major rail lines with eight passenger trains daily, adding to Elgin's business as a shipping point for cotton, wool, and livestock. By 1890, Elgin had a population of 1,100 and supported two hotels, a broom factory, two doctors, a dentist, and the Elgin Courier newspaper. Coal proved better for the economy, when the large coal belt nearby was mined in the early 20th century, bringing Latin-Americans and African-Americans to the area, as both free and slave labor. 

The year 1900 resulted in a bumper crop of cotton and Elgin prospered. Elgin grew slowly but steadily through the 20th century, from 1,258 in 1904 to 4,846 in 1990. The city incorporated in 1901, electing Charles Gillespie, building contractor, as mayor, as well as J.D. Hemphill as marshal, W.E. McCullough, J. Wed Davis, Ed Lawhon, Max Hirach, and F.S. Wade as aldermen. Local law enforcement was established to enforce newly established civil and criminal codes. By 1910, Elgin was enjoying a period of great prosperity as families from out on the prairie and surrounding communities moved to town and built nice homes.

By 1940, Elgin was also the site of two big brick and tile plants. Elgin enterprise was stimulated during World War II by the proximity of the army training facility Camp Swift. A third brick company was established in the town in the mid-1950s, lured by the high-quality clay deposits in the area. In addition to the brick plants, a local sausage factory processed thousands of pounds of beef and pork a week; Elgin Hot Sausage continued to enjoy a widespread reputation, and Elgin rapidly became the most important agricultural center in Bastrop County. Five cotton gins and a cotton oil mill were in operation at the same time. Other industries included feed and grain processing and hydraulic press manufacturing.

By the 1980s, proximity to Austin had begun to attract commuters to Elgin. In the mid-1980s, the Elgin Courier was still being published, the sausage had achieved wider fame, and two brick and tile plants were still in operation. Elgin was also the site of a furniture plant and a leather works.

The eastern side of town was heavily damaged by a high-end EF2 tornado on March 21, 2022.

Downtown 

The Elgin Commercial Historic District includes 14 city blocks of commercial and industrial buildings. Most of these buildings are constructed of locally produced brick and were erected from 1872 to 1947. The Elgin Commercial Historic District was added to the National Register of Historic Places in 1996. Within the 14-block district, 67 buildings are considered contributing structures. A contributing structure is one which has maintained its architectural integrity. Southside includes Central Avenue and Avenue C in the downtown district. Five buildings are under restoration in the Southside area. During the past 14 years, private property owners, business owners, and the public sector have invested about $9 million in the downtown area. A majority of the buildings on Main Street, from Depot Street to First Street, have been restored or renovated, and many are currently under renovation. Local developer Allan Tolbert III has renovated a total of 7 historic buildings. Including the original Southside (Sausage) located on Central Ave. Market building on The Elgin Main Street Program provides a variety of incentives to building owners such as a discounted paint program, free dumpsters, and free advice on architectural design and restoration.

Elgin became a Texas Main Street city in 1990, and in 1999, 2000, and 2001 was selected as a National Main Street Community. Main Street is a national approach to saving our heritage by preserving historic downtown areas. Each year, three cities are selected by the Texas Historical Commission and Anice Read Main Street Center to become Main Street Cities. Communities make a commitment to hire a staff person, provide office space, supplies, and a small budget. The primary commitment is to preserving and revitalizing the historic commercial business district. Volunteerism is a key part of the success of any Main Street program.

Geography 
Most of the city lies in Bastrop County, with a portion extending westward into Travis and Williamson Counties. Most of north Elgin is built on blackland prairie soil.

Climate 
The climate in this area is characterized by hot, humid summers and generally mild to cool winters.  According to the Köppen Climate Classification system, Elgin has a humid subtropical climate, Cfa on climate maps.

Education 

The Texas Legislature designated Travis and Bastrop counties as being in the boundary of Austin Community College's district. ACC opened its ACC Elgin branch in the city in 2013.

Demographics 

As of the 2020 United States census, there were 9,784 people, 3,033 households, and 2,158 families residing in the city.

As of the census of 2010, there were 8,135 people. The population density was 1,402.6 people per square mile (542.3/km2). There were 2,948 housing units at an average density of 508.3/sq mi (196.5/km2). The racial makeup of the city was 57.14% White, 17.30% African American, 1.00% Native American, 0.49% Asian, 0.20% Pacific Islander, 20.12% from other races, and 3.75% from two or more races. Hispanic or Latino of any race were 45.67% of the population.

As of the census of 2000, there were 1,869 households, out of which 36.2% had children under the age of 18 living with them, 51.8% were married couples living together, 14.6% had a female householder with no husband present, and 27.8% were non-families. 22.3% of all households were made up of individuals, and 11.6% had someone living alone who was 65 years of age or older. The average household size was 2.98 and the average family size was 3.50.

In the city, the population was spread out, with 29.8% under the age of 18, 10.6% from 18 to 24, 28.4% from 25 to 44, 17.6% from 45 to 64, and 13.6% who were 65 years of age or older. The median age was 32 years. For every 100 females, there were 97.9 males. For every 100 females age 18 and over, there were 93.8 males.

The median income for a household in the city was $38,750, and the median income for a family was $48,125. Males had a median income of $31,368 versus $21,095 for females. The per capita income for the city was $16,698. About 10.4% of families and 16.1% of the population were below the poverty line, including 21.2% of those under age 18 and 21.7% of those age 65 or over.

Government and infrastructure 

The U.S. Postal Service operates the Elgin Post Office. The post office has "Texas Farm," a mural by Julius Woeltz located above the door to the office of the postmaster. Created as part of the 1930s Federal Arts Project, it depicts men harvesting vegetables and picking corn.

In 2022, city voters approved the decriminalization of possession of misdemeanor amounts of marijuana.

Economy 
The Chamber of Commerce is located in the original 1872 Houston and Texas Central Railroad building.

Sports 
Ray Culp, a two-time Major League Baseball All-Star pitcher, was born in Elgin.

Elgin is host to three different sports for the youth of the community and surrounding area. Pop Warner football and cheer-leading squads, Elgin Youth Football, and Elgin Youth Soccer Association are available.

Little League World Series 2006 
The Elgin Major Girls softball team came from behind in the consolation match-up with the team from Tennessee to win third place in the 2006 Softball World Series in Portland, Oregon. Tennessee defeated Elgin 5–4 in seven innings.

Little League World Series 2007 
Elgin Little League's Major Girls' softball All-Stars defended their Southwest Region Championship and earned a second straight trip to the World Series in 2007. The championship game slipped from the Elgin Major girls' hands in a very close game against the undefeated Mattawan Little League team from Michigan, losing 2–0. Elgin took home the second place title for the 2007 Little League World Series as the Southwest Region champion. Elgin advanced to the finals with a 5–0 record.

Notable people 
 Ray Culp, Major League Baseball All-Star pitcher
 Jake Helgren, Film director, producer and screenwriter
 Chester Snowden, Artist and illustrator

Filmed in Elgin 
Several notable films have used Elgin as a location:  They include:
 1974 The Texas Chain Saw Massacre
 1975 The Great Waldo Pepper
 1982 The Best Little Whorehouse in Texas
 1993 What's Eating Gilbert Grape
 1993 A Perfect World
 1995 The Big Green
 1996 Michael
 1999 Varsity Blues
 2002 25th Hour
 2002 The New Guy 
 2003 The Alamo
 2006 A Scanner Darkly
 2014 Transformers: Age of Extinction
 2018 Fear the Walking Dead
 2019 Mercy Black

References

External links 

 City of Elgin official website
 Greater Elgin Chamber of Commerce
 Elgin Public Library
 Elgin Independent School District

Cities in Texas
Cities in Bastrop County, Texas
Cities in Travis County, Texas
Cities in Greater Austin